Veronika Mykolaïvna Ivasiuk (also transliterated Ivasyuk, born 12 October 1995) is a Ukrainian weightlifter, competing in the 58 kg category and representing Ukraine at international competitions.

Career
She competed at the 2015 World Weightlifting Championships.

Ivasyuk won the silver medal at the 2016 European Weightlifting Championships after lifting 90 kg in the snatch.

She competed in the women's 58 kg event at the 2016 Summer Olympics.

Major results

References

External links
 
 
 
 
 
 
 
 
 

1995 births
Living people
Ukrainian female weightlifters
Place of birth missing (living people)
Olympic weightlifters of Ukraine
Weightlifters at the 2016 Summer Olympics
20th-century Ukrainian women
21st-century Ukrainian women